The fifth and final season of the Naruto anime series, titled "5th Stage" in Japan, is directed by Hayato Date, produced by Studio Pierrot and TV Tokyo, and based on Masashi Kishimoto's manga series. The season follows Naruto Uzumaki and friends completing every assigned mission. The sequel television series Naruto: Shippuden, aired on February 15, 2007.

The season aired from May 10, 2006, to February 8, 2007, on TV Tokyo. Sony Pictures Entertainment collected the episodes in a total of ten DVD volumes, each containing four episodes between January 1 and July 4, 2007. Viz Media's English adaptation of the series was collected in several DVD boxes from the series. It was the last season to air on Cartoon Network's Toonami, before it moved on October 4, 2008. The final eleven episodes never aired on television in the United States, after the series was cancelled. The remaining eleven episodes of the English dub aired in Canada on YTV's Bionix from October 25, to December 6, 2009. 

The season uses five musical themes for the Japanese version with two openings and three closings. The first opening is Flow's "Re:member", which is replaced by Hearts Grow's  from episode 203 onwards. The English episodes use the same openings, and an instrumental version of "Rise" by Jeremy Sweet and Ian Nickus as the closing theme.


Episode list

Notes

References

2006 Japanese television seasons
2007 Japanese television seasons
Naruto episodes